North Caldwell is an unincorporated community in Greenbrier County, West Virginia, United States. It is a major trailhead of the Greenbrier River Trail.

References

Unincorporated communities in Greenbrier County, West Virginia
Unincorporated communities in West Virginia